Gytis Radzevičius (born 17 July 1995) is a Lithuanian professional basketball player for Rytas Vilnius of the Lithuanian Basketball League.

Playing career
Radzevičius started his professional career in KK Kupiškis basketball team.

He moved to National Basketball league in 2015–16 season, when he signed with BC Perlas. He spent the 2019–20 season with Juventus Utena where he averaged 11.7 points and 5.5 rebounds per game. On 29 July 2020, Radzevičius signed with Rytas Vilnius.

References

1995 births
Living people
BC Juventus
Small forwards
Basketball players from Vilnius